are Japanese folding screens made from several joined panels, bearing decorative painting and calligraphy, used to separate interiors and enclose private spaces, among other uses.

History 
 are thought to have originated in Han dynasty China and are thought to have been imported to Japan in the 7th or 8th century (Nara period).

Nara-period  retained their original form of a single, free-standing, legged panel. In the 8th century, multi-paneled  made their appearance, and were used as furnishings in the imperial court, mainly in important ceremonies. The six-paneled  were the most common in the Nara period, and were covered in silk and connected with leather or silk cords. The painting on each panel was framed by a silk brocade, and the panel was bound with a wood frame.

, coin-shaped metal hinges, were introduced and widely used to connect the panels instead of silk cords.

During the Muromachi period (1392–1568), folding screens became more popular and were found in many residences, dojo, and shops.

The paper hinges, although quite strong, required that the panel infrastructure be as light as possible. The resulting structure was lightweight and durable, yet still quite delicate.

In the following Azuchi–Momoyama period (1568–1600) and early Edo period (1600–1868), the popularity of  grew, as interest and investment in arts and crafts developed significantly thanks to the patronage of the merchant classes.  adorned samurai residences, conveying high rank and demonstrating wealth and power.

In the modern day,  are often machine-made; however, hand-crafted  are still available, mainly produced by families that preserve the crafting traditions.

Mexican 

During the colonial-era of Mexico, the art of Mexico was influenced by Asian art, objects and artists introduced to the region via the Manilla Galleons. Notable among the influences were Japanese folding screens.

The scenes depicted on these folding screens were frequently historical, such as the Conquest of Tenochtitlán. Others depicted everyday life, such as a folding screen depicting the happenings of the village of Ixtacalco.

Japonism 
 were a popular Japonism import item to Europe and America starting in the late 19th century.

Contemporary  artists

He painted nearly 100 screens over a thirty-year period, several of which are in the National Museum of Modern Art, Tokyo.

Since Matazo's death, very few artists still paint . Many contemporary artists continue to allude to the  format, aligning multiple panels in a row, creating ultra-wide paintings. In the age of international art commerce, this is done more for ease of handling and transport, since ultimately, these works are displayed flat on a wall.

 produced an exceptional two-screen  (each screen with six panels) for his Master's project at Tama Art University entitled . Abandoning the traditional  format, Sato used individual panels, which more closely resemble  (sliding screens used as interior partitions).

Allan West ( 1962), who studied with Matazo Kayama Tokyo University of the Arts from 1989–1992, paints hanging scrolls, fans and folding screens:

West has been commissioned to create many folding screens which are found in hotels, offices and concert halls throughout Japan.

Similar to West, but based in Europe, Benjamin Gordon ( 1968) is an American painter whose focus is Japanese genres. While his subject matter and treatment captures the spirit of Japanese painting, unlike the  painters, Gordon paints with oil paints, creating multiple layers of translucent color. Gordon's screens are distinguished by the lack of a black outer frame. Instead, he uses unconventional fabrics for both the front and the back of his screens, which adds a layer of commentary or meaning to the subject of the painting.

Kikuta's  are immediately recognizable by their subject matter of birds and animals of Yambaru (forest area located near Kikuta's home in the northern part of Okinawa Island), and by the paper backs of the screens, on which woodcut patterns of fern fronds are printed.

See also 
List of partitions of traditional Japanese architecture
 (textile curtain on a portable stand)
 (textile doorhanging)
 (reed blind)

References

External links 

Japanese Architecture and Art Net Users System Byoubu entry
Momoyama, Japanese Art in the Age of Grandeur, an exhibition catalog from The Metropolitan Museum of Art (fully available online as PDF), which contains material on byōbu  
 Byobu: The Grandeur of Japanese Screens, a companion Web site to an exhibition at the Yale University Art Gallery, which contains images and descriptions of noteworthy byōbu.

 
Japanese furniture
Japanese words and phrases
Partitions in traditional Japanese architecture
Portable furniture